In mathematical group theory, Frobenius's theorem states that if n divides the order of a finite group G, then the number of solutions of xn = 1 is a multiple of n.

Statement

A more general version of Frobenius's theorem states that if C is a conjugacy class with h elements of a finite group G with g elements and n is a positive integer, then the number of elements k such that kn is in C is a multiple of the greatest common divisor (hn,g) .

Applications

One application of Frobenius's theorem is to show that the coefficients of the Artin–Hasse exponential are p integral, by interpreting them in terms of the number of elements of order a power of p in the symmetric group Sn.

Frobenius conjecture

Frobenius conjectured that if in addition the number of solutions to xn=1 is exactly n where n divides the order of G then these solutions form a normal subgroup. This has been proved as a consequence of the classification of finite simple groups. The symmetric group S3 has exactly 4 solutions to x4=1 but these do not form a normal subgroup; this is not a counterexample to the conjecture as 4 does not divide the order of S3.

References

 
Theorems in group theory